Oboý is a small settlement in Bereket District, Balkan Province in western Turkmenistan.

Overview
Oboy is located near Kyurendag Ridge which is the most western foothills of the Kopetdag Mountains.

The climate in the village is largely affected by Karakum Desert.

Oboý Railway Station 

Bereket Railway Station (Oboý demirýol menzili) is the small railway station located 2 km from Oboy settlement. It was built in 2014. The station is operated by the Türkmendemirýollary.
Oboý Station is one of the railways stations located on the North-South Transnational Railway (Russia - Kazakhstan - Turkmenistan - Iran - Persian Gulf.

See also 
 Bereket District
 Balkan Province
 List of cities, towns and villages in Turkmenistan

References

Populated places in Balkan Region
Populated places established in 1840
Populated places along the Silk Road